Bakırköy—İncirli is an underground station on the M1 line of the Istanbul Metro. It is located in north-eastern Bakırköy district next to the E80 motorway. Bakırköy—İncirli was opened on 7 March 1994 as part of the extension from Zeytinburnu.

Layout

References

Railway stations opened in 1994
1994 establishments in Turkey
Istanbul metro stations
Bakırköy